Quinetia is a genus of flowering plants in the family Asteraceae.

There is only one known species,  Quinetia urvillei, native to Australia (Western Australia, South Australia, Victoria).

References

External links
Florabase Flora, Western Australia Flora
Australian National Botanic Gardens
Flickriver photograph

Monotypic Asteraceae genera
Gnaphalieae
Endemic flora of Australia